Aspendell is an unincorporated community in Inyo County, California. It lies at an elevation of 8409 feet (2563 m).

References

Unincorporated communities in Inyo County, California
Unincorporated communities in California